The Coffin Shop, also known as the Kring Carpenter Shop, is a historic commercial building in Gainesville, Sumter County, Alabama.  The one-story wood-frame structure was built by Edward N. Kring between 1860 and 1870 as an auxiliary space
to his carpenter shop, which originally stood next door.  It is a simple gable-fronted structure, with a shotgun plan interior.  The exterior features a clapboard-sided front, with a scalloped bargeboard trim on the gable.  The other external walls are covered in board and batten siding.  It was added to the National Register of Historic Places on October 29, 1985.

References

National Register of Historic Places in Sumter County, Alabama
Shotgun architecture
Buildings and structures in Sumter County, Alabama
Commercial buildings on the National Register of Historic Places in Alabama
Coffins